Allison Kieffer (born September 16, 1987) is an American athlete who competes in distance running events. Kieffer placed 5th in 2:29:39 at the 2017 New York City Marathon. She placed 7th at the 2018 New York City Marathon with a time of 2:28:12. Kieffer is a coach and nutritionist.

Professional

2010-2015

Kieffer joined the New York Athletic Club and ran with Princeton Tigers All-American Sarah Cummings. She placed sixth with a time of 20:14.2 at the 2010 USATF National Club Cross Country Championships in Charlotte, North Carolina. Kieffer qualified to represent Team USA at the 2011 NACAC Cross Country Championships.

At the 2011 NACAC Cross Country Championships' 6 km race at Port of Spain, Trinidad and Tobago, Keiffer placed fourth with a time of 20:29.6 behind Team USA teammates Kim Conley, and Megan Duwell and champion Kathryn Harrison. The US team took home gold medals.

In 2012 Kieffer was trained in Boulder, Colorado by Coach Brad Hudson and ran a 10 km at Stanford University in a time of 32:25.69 on April 29, 2012, which qualified her for the 10,000 meters at the 2012 United States Olympic Trials (track and field). She did not start due to injury.

Kieffer placed 47th at the 2013 US Cross Country Championships in Saint Louis, Missouri. In 2014 Kieffer won the Japan Day race in the New York Road Runners on May 11. Kieffer placed second at the 2015 10 km Scotland Run in Central Park, New York with a time of 35:28 in April 2015. She placed 20th at USA Road 5 km championships hosted by CVS in Providence, Rhode Island with a time 17:05 on September 20, 2015.

2016
In January, Kieffer placed first winning the 2016 Miami Marathon in 2:55:30. She choose to switch from the half marathon the night before the race after learning the elite field for the half-marathon was full and only one woman in the elite meeting was running the full marathon.

On April 9, 2016, Kieffer placed first winning the 2016 Fort Washington Avenue Armory Indoor Track marathon with a time of 2:44:44 (setting an indoor world record) which was broken the next year. Kieffer placed ninth at the Cherry Blossom 10-Mile Run in a time of 56:40.90.

2017

Kieffer placed fifth in 2:29:39 at the 2017 New York City Marathon. She placed fourth in the 2017 10 mile championship hosted at the Medtronic Twin Cities Marathon in Minneapolis–Saint Paul. Kieffer placed 11th in the 10,000 meters in Sacramento, California at the 2017 USA Outdoor Track and Field Championships in a time of 33:24.78.

2018
Kieffer won Doha Half Marathon in a best time of 70 minutes 40 seconds.
Kieffer placed fourth in 32:52 at the AJC Peachtree Road Race which hosted the USATF 10 km road championships behind winner Stephanie Bruce, Aliphine Tuliamuk, and Sara Hall.
Kieffer placed second at 2018 Faxon Law New Haven Road Race US 20 km road Championships in 85 degree and humid conditions in a time of 1:09:20 behind winner Sara Hall. She placed 7th in the 2018 New York City Marathon with a time of 2:28:12.

US Championships

NCAA
Allie Kieffer graduated from Wake Forest University in 2009. Kieffer earned a scholarship to run collegiately at Wake Forest Demon Deacons in NCAA Division 1 national cross country and track and field. Kieffer went to post grad at Arizona State University in 2009-2010.

Early life and education
Kieffer grew up in West Islip, New York and attended West Islip High School. She earned four-time all-state NYSPHSAA selection. Kieffer competed in the 2003 Foot Locker Cross Country Championships. She placed second place in the indoor mile at the 2004 national high school championships to earn All-America honors.

References

External links

Allie Kieffer at All-Athletics
Allie Kieffer at ARRS
Allie Kieffer at Arizona State University
Allison Kieffer at Wake Forest University

Kieffer's 2017 Records at Runnerspace.com

1987 births
Living people
American female middle-distance runners
Arizona State Sun Devils women's track and field athletes
Wake Forest Demon Deacons women's track and field athletes
People from West Islip, New York
Track and field athletes from Buffalo, New York
Track and field athletes from New York City
American female long-distance runners
Wake Forest Demon Deacons women's cross country runners
Arizona State Sun Devils women's cross country runners
21st-century American women